Grabowiec is a Polish coat of arms.

History

It was used by the Henke and Felisiak szlachta families in the times of Congress Poland.

Blazon

Notable bearers

Notable bearers of this coat of arms include:

 Gustav Henke

See also
 Polish heraldry
 Heraldic family
 List of Polish nobility coats of arms

Sources 
 {pol} Polska Encyklopedia Szlachecka. Warszawa 1935 r.,tom II, s.171

Grabowiec